Houde is a French surname. Notable people with the surname include:

Camillien Houde (1889–1958), Canadian politician
Charles-Édouard Houde (1823–1912), Canadian politician
Claude Houde (born 1947), Canadian ice hockey player
Éric Houde (born 1976), Canadian ice hockey player
Frédéric Houde (1847–1884), Canadian journalist and politician
Germain Houde (born 1952), Canadian actor
Harrison Houde (born 1996), Canadian actor
Jean Houde (born 1939), French sprint canoeist
Louis Houde (1879–1945), Canadian politician
Louis-José Houde (born 1977), Canadian comedian
Moïse Houde (1811–1885), Canadian politician
Pierre Houde, Canadian sports announcer
Pierre Houdé, Belgian cyclist
Roger Houde (born 1938), Canadian politician
Serge Houde (born 1953), Canadian actor
Sylvain Houde, Canadian singer

French-language surnames